HMS Rosebay (previously known as Splendor (PG-97)) was a  built for World War II. She was disposed of soon after the war.

Splendor (PG-97) was launched for the United States Navy on 11 February 1943 by the Kingston Shipbuilding Co., Kingston, Ont., Canada. However, upon completion, Splendor was transferred to the Royal Navy on 28 July 1943 and commissioned as HMS Rosebay. On 20 March 1946 she was returned to the United States Navy. Never commissioned in the United States Navy, Splendor was transferred to the Maritime Commission on 19 November 1946 for disposal.

References

External links
NavSource Online: Gunboat Photo Archive - HMS Rosebay (K 286) ex-Splendor (PG 97)

World War II naval ships of the United States
Ships built in Ontario
1942 ships
Action-class gunboats
Rosebay